Fitzpatrick House may refer to:

in the United States
(by state, city)

Fitzpatrick House (Lockport, Illinois), listed on the National Register of Historic Places (NRHP)
Fitzpatrick House (Mooresville, Tennessee), listed on the NRHP in Marshall County, Tennessee

It may also refer to:
W. T. Fitzpatrick House, Mount Sterling, Kentucky, listed on the NRHP in Montgomery County, Kentucky
Fitzpatrick-Harmon House, Prestonsburg, Kentucky, listed on the NRHP in Floyd County, Kentucky
May-Fitzpatrick House, Prestonsburg, Kentucky, listed on the NRHP s in Floyd County, Kentucky
Turner-Fitzpatrick House, Richmond, Kentucky, listed on the NRHP in Madison County, Kentucky

See also
Fitzpatrick Ranch Historic District, Avon, Montana, listed on the NRHP in Powell County, Montana